Mangaratiba is a municipality located in the Brazilian state of Rio de Janeiro. Its population is 45,220 (2020) and its area is 352 km2.

Part of the Sylvester Stallone film The Expendables was shot in the central part of the city. The pier that is exploded in the film is the pier that the main ferry to Ilha Grande uses as its base of operation.

Many large bulk carriers enter the port of Mangaratiba, fetching heavy loads of iron ore bound for especially European ports. As such, the port of Mangaratiba is one of the largest in Brazil.

Political crisis 
The municipality of Mangaratiba has been suffering from what has been described as a "strong political crisis". Many of the recent city's mayors have been arrested during their terms, which at times have triggered supplementary elections at odd years outside of the usual 4-year cycle.

References

Populated coastal places in Rio de Janeiro (state)
Municipalities in Rio de Janeiro (state)